Samuel Thomas Hughes (October 20, 1910 – August 9, 1981) was an American second baseman in baseball's Negro leagues.

Born in Louisville, Kentucky, Hughes played primarily for the Elite Giants through their various stops in Nashville, Columbus, Washington, D.C. and Baltimore, always in the Negro National League. He served in the US Army during World War II. At age 42, Hughes received votes listing him on the 1952 Pittsburgh Courier player-voted poll of the Negro leagues' best players ever. Hughes died at age 70 in Los Angeles.

References

External links
 and Seamheads

Baltimore Elite Giants players
Louisville White Sox players
Washington Pilots players
Nashville Elite Giants players
Columbus Elite Giants players
Washington Elite Giants players
1910 births
1981 deaths
Baseball players from Louisville, Kentucky
20th-century African-American sportspeople
Baseball infielders

 Sammy Hughes at SABR (Baseball BioProject)